Rui Paulo Silva Júnior is a retired footballer last playing for Cyprus first division club Olympiakos Nicosia, at left-back or left wing-back position. A fast player with accurate crosses and good stamina.

He now is Director of football at AEL Limassol with Pambos Christodoulou as manager where they are trying to strengthen AEL with players from Portugal and its former colonies.

At AEL Limassol he was considered one of the most consistent players and missed only 2 matches in 2 seasons.

He played in Doxa Katokopia in the season 2007/2008, helping it remain in the first division.

Scouting career
He is currently the head of scouting at Omonia Nicosia.

External links
 zerozero.pt

1975 births
Living people
Portuguese footballers
Angolan footballers
Portuguese sportspeople of Angolan descent
Portuguese expatriate footballers
Expatriate footballers in Cyprus
Portuguese expatriate sportspeople in Cyprus
Cypriot First Division players
G.D. Estoril Praia players
F.C. Alverca players
Doxa Katokopias FC players
AEL Limassol players
Olympiakos Nicosia players
S.C. Praiense players
Association football defenders